Whole Oats is the debut studio album by American pop music duo Hall & Oates. The album was released in September 1972, by Atlantic Records.

The duo consisted of Daryl Hall and John Oates, both of Philadelphia. Prior to making this album, the duo made numerous demos, some of which were released on the Past Times Behind collection. It was released on CD for the second time on February 12, 2008 by American Beat Records, putting it back in print after the original Atlantic Records CD release went out of print. On February 24, 2017, Friday Music released a remastered version of the album along with their third studio album, War Babies. The music on this record is a combination of soft rock, folk, and soul.

Track listing

Personnel 
 Daryl Hall – vocals, keyboards, synthesizer, guitars, mandolin, vibraphone, arrangements, cello and arrangements on "Southeast City Window"
 John Oates – vocals, guitars, arrangements
 Jerry Ricks – guitar on "Southeast City Window"
 Bill Keith – pedal steel guitar on "All Our Love" and "Southeast City Window"
 Mike McCarthy – bass
 Jim Helmer – drums, percussion
 Arif Mardin – horn and string arrangements

Production 
 Produced by Arif Mardin
 Recorded and Engineered by Lewis Hahn and Gene Paul
 Mixed by Gene Paul
 Mastered by Stephen Innocenzi
 Art Direction and Design – Richard Mantel
 Photography – John Paul Endress

References

1972 debut albums
Hall & Oates albums
Albums produced by Arif Mardin
Atlantic Records albums